Emirates Post is the official postal operator for the United Arab Emirates. It is a subsidiary of Emirates Post Group.

History 
It was opened on August 19, 1909, being managed by the Indian Post Office Services until India’s independence in 1947. The postal services were finally established as the General Directorate of Postal Services under the Ministry of Communications in 1972, following the formation of the UAE.

UAE postal service timeline

 19/08/1909 First postal agency opened in the Emirate of Dubai, affiliated to and managed by Indian Post Office Services.
 07/10/1932 First letter posted from a Dubai postal service via Sharjah Airport.
 01/04/1942 The Agency became an integrated Post Office providing all basic services.
 15/10/1947 Management of Post Office came under the supervision of Pakistani Administration.
 01/04/1948 Dubai Postal management transferred to British administration after independence of India and Pakistan.
 07/01/1961 Issue of the first set of stamps of the Trucial States in Dubai.
 1963–1964 Opening of post offices in emirates of Abu Dhabi, Sharjah, Ajman, Umm Al Quwain, Ras Al Khaimah and Fujairah.
 01/08/1972 Establishment of General Directorate of Postal Services under Ministry of Communications.
 01/01/1973 Issuing of first set of ordinary stamps bearing the name of the United Arab Emirates (UAE).
 30/03/1973 The United Arab Emirates joins the Universal Postal Union.
 01/04/1985 General Postal Authority established.
 29/05/2001 Federal Decree establishing Emirates Postal Establishment (Emirates Post) issued.
 16/09/2007 Establishment of Emirates Post Group Holding, with Emirates Post becoming a subsidiary of the Group. Emirates Post Group was established in 2007, with Emirates Post, Empost, EDC and Wall Street Exchange becoming subsidiaries of the Group.
 2013 Issue of the Federal Law No. 3 of 2013 concerning the establishment of the "Emirates Post Group"  legal presence and capability to execute, and have an independent budget and replace. And integrating both Emirates Post and Empost as an operational unit part of the group.

 2019 As of April 2019, the United Arab Emirates is the only Arab country to win three "International Express Mail Service accolade for outstanding Customer Service" awards.
 2021 Emirates Post expands operations into Israel after tying up with Israel Post.

References

External links
Official website.

Communications in the United Arab Emirates
Postal system of the United Arab Emirates
Logistics companies of the United Arab Emirates
Philately of the United Arab Emirates
Government-owned companies of the United Arab Emirates